Nuno Campos may refer to:

 Nuno Campos (footballer, born 1975), Portuguese former football midfielder and current manager
 Nuno Campos (footballer, born 1993), Portuguese football right-back